The Battle of Misiche, Mesiche, or Massice ( mšyk;  mšyk) (dated between January 13 and March 14, 244 AD.) was fought between the Sasanians and the Romans in Misiche, Mesopotamia.

Background
The initial war began when the Roman Emperor Gordian III invaded the Sasanian Empire in 243 AD.  His troops advanced as far as Misiche. The location of that city (or maybe a district) is conjectural, but is placed at modern Anbar.

The battle
The Romans were defeated and it is unclear whether Gordian died during battle or was assassinated later by his own officers.

The Inscription at Naqsh-e Rustam
The Battle is mentioned on the trilingual inscription king Shapur I made at Naqsh-e Rustam:

When at first we had become established in the empire, Gordian Caesar assembled from all of the Roman, Goth and German lands a military force and marched on Asorestan (Mesopotamia) against the Ērānšahr (Sasanian Empire) and against us. On the border of Asorestan at Misiche, a great frontal battle occurred. Gordian Caesar was killed and the Roman force was destroyed. And the Romans made Philip Caesar. Then Philip Caesar came to us for terms, and to ransom their lives, gave us 500,000 denars, and became tributary to us. And for this reason we have renamed Misiche Peroz-Shapur [literally "Victorious Shapur"].

The Roman sources never admitted the defeat. The contemporary and later Roman sources claim that the Roman expedition was entirely or partially successful, but the emperor was murdered after a plot by Philip the Arab. However, some recent sources speculate that the Sasanian victory must not be invented and reject Philip's plot as the ultimate reason of Gordian's death. While some sources claim that it isn't likely that Gordian died during the battle, as Shapur's inscription claims, others state he died on the battlefield. Some sources mention a cenotaph of the murdered emperor at Zaita, near Circesium of Osroene (some 400 km north of Misiche).<ref>Ammianus Marcellinus, Res Gestae, 23.5.7</ref> The confusion of the sources about the expedition and the death of the emperor makes it possible that, after the defeat, Roman army was frustrated enough to get rid of the teenage emperor.
The third tradition, reported in 6th century by John Malalas and three more eastern historians in 9th to 12th century, specifies that Gordianus crushed his thigh falling off his horse in battle and died of his injury, Malalas further specifying that he died on the way back.

Aftermath
Gordian's successor, Philip the Arab, was proclaimed emperor of Rome and made peace with Shapur. The next major clash between the two empires took place in 252, when Shapur defeated a large Roman force at the Battle of Barbalissos and successfully invaded Syria and part of Anatolia.

Notes

References
 
 Rostovtzeff, Michael I. "Res Gestae Divi Saporis and Dura." Berytus 8:1 (1943): 17–60.
 Potter, David S. The Roman Empire at Bay AD 180–395. New York: Routledge, 2004. 
 Farrokh, Kaveh. Sassanian Elite Cavalry AD 224–642''. Osprey, 2005. 

240s conflicts
Mische
244
240s in the Roman Empire
Al Anbar Governorate
3rd century in Iran
Battles involving Germanic peoples
Battles involving the Goths